is a Japanese manga series written and illustrated by Piroya. It was originally a one-shot published in Flex Comix's Comic Meteor website in July 2018, before being serialized in the same website since July 2019. An anime television series adaptation is set to premiere in 2023.

Characters

Media

Manga
Written and illustrated by Piroya, Dekoboko Majo no Oyako Jijō was initially a one-shot published in Flex Comix's Comic Meteor website on July 11, 2018. It began serialization in the same website on July 3, 2019. As of September 2022, four tankōbon volumes have been released.

Volume list

Anime
In September 2022, it was announced that the manga would be adapted into an anime television series. It is set to premiere in 2023.

References

Further reading

External links
  
  
 

Anime series based on manga
Comedy anime and manga
Comic Meteor manga
Fantasy anime and manga
Japanese comedy webcomics
Shōnen manga
Upcoming anime television series
Webcomics in print
Witchcraft in anime and manga